Barsht is a Yiddish surname literally meaning "borscht". Notable people with the surname include:

Abrek Barsht (1919-2006), Russian Jewish pilot, World War II Hero of the Soviet Union

Fictional characters
 Steve Barsht from Sabotage (1939 film)

Yiddish-language surnames